M. G. Ejaife (born 1 June 1912 – 6 March 1972) was an Urhobo nationalist from Okpara Inland and the first  principal of the premier Urhobo College Effurun,Uvwie. He was one of two recipients of scholarship awards from Urhobo Progress Union during World War II years. (The other recipient was G. N. Igho.) He returned to Nigeria after his graduation with a B.A. degree of Durham University in 1948, thus becoming the first Urhobo graduate. He then became the founding Principal of Urhobo College, Effurun. He brought that famous secondary school to its great heights in many fields. Mr. Ejaife later served in many other capacities in Urhobo affairs. He was Urhobo's first Senator, serving with distinction in Nigeria's Upper Chamber during the country's First Republic.

Early life

McNeil Gabriel Ejaife was born 1 June 1912 to Utujoh Ejaife of Okpara and Temienor Akpowhowho of Eku at Okurekpo in Agon, an Urhobo Clan in Delta State of Nigeria. Okpara Inland is a community located in the Ethiope East local government area of Delta State Nigeria. This community is a progeny of the Agbon Kingdom. He was one of three siblings. The oldest was a woman. His two brothers were Frederick Obodeti Ejaife, a lawyer, and Johnson Jakovo Ejaife, a medical doctor. He also had three other brothers from a different mother. One of them James Madedon Ejaife, a tailor who lived at the Ejaife house at Okpara Waterside. He was named McNeil after the captain of a British ship with whom his mother did some trading business.

Okpara was mainly a farming community when Ejaife was young, the crops grown there such as yams, okra and cassava were cultivated largely by families and clans. His father was a hardworking peasant whose ancestors were all highly respected members of the community.

Education and career

He attended Anglican school at Okpara and then went to St Andrews Teacher's training college Oyo, in Oyo State. Some of his contemporaries at St Andrews were: Dr S Taiwo, a former federal permanent secretary of education; chief Ajasin, a former minister in the Nigeria federal government; the Rev Alayande former principal at Ibadan Grammar School, Ibadan (founded March 31st, 1913). Following graduation from there in the early 1930s, he went to Warri where he taught at the CMS elementary until the latter part of the 1930s.

He later moved to Ibuzor in Delta State where he was to teach at St Thomas's teacher’ training College until returning to Warri in 1943. During that time he devoted himself to extramural studies and sat for and obtained his London Matriculation, as it was then called. At about that time, his hard work studiousness were recognized by the Urhobo People, particularly Chief Mukoro Mowoe. Under the latter's leadership, plan were being made to create a secondary school. Because of the potential seen in McNeil Ejaife, he was awarded a scholarship to study abroad.

In 1944 he left his wife and three sons aged five, four, and two to the care of his father in law in Warri and proceeded to Fourabay College in Sierra Leone for the first phase of his undergraduate studies. He passed his intermediate Bachelors in Art Degree after eighteen months and then went on to Durham University in England where he graduated with BA in arts in 1948. Being the first Urhobo Graduate, he returned to a grand welcome by the Urhobo Community. Transportation for the entourage was provided by Chief Onokar Aghoghovia. The reception was held at the home of Chief Mukoro Mowoe in Okere Road, Warri. Present at the time were Chief Mowarin, Chief James Obahor, chief Akpoteheri Edewor of Robert Road Warri.

Ejaife and Urhobo College

When the time came to form Urhobo secondary he was appointed the founding principal. The school was initially called Urhobo Collegiate School but later changed to its current name Urhobo College. The school was first located on Warri-Sapele Road Less than half a mile from Cemetery Road, not far from Igbudu, and almost adjacent to the old Warri cemetery. There were about two dozen students at the time He chose the school Motto; “AUT OPTIMUM AUT NIHIL” i.e., “The Best or Nothing”. Two of the founding Students were Wilfred Obahor and Emmanuel Susu. The principal's residence was a bungalow rented from Chief Egboge in Igbudu, opposite GKS campus on Warri – Sapele Road. Mrs. Cecilia Ejaife procured the students Food initially but chief Akpovegbeta Onokuakpor was soon appointed the food contractor. Some of the founding teachers were Chief Daniel Okumagba, Mr. Omniabus, Gordon Ako, and Mr. George Diejomaoh. Mr. A.I. Igho became the vice-principal on arrival from England in 1951 as the second Urhobo graduate. He died rather prematurely, a few years later.

The current campus at Effurun was opened in 1950. The student population grew from then on. The principal's house was first occupied by the Ejaife family in 1957. Other staff houses were also opened at about that time. The houses were occupied by the likes of Mr. Samuel Okudu who later left and subsequently became the registrar of the University of Ibadan. Professor Tamnuo and Mr. Demas Akpoe, Mr. Vincent Uvieghara, just to name a few, were also on the staff.  MG Ejaife remained the principal until 1966, the year of the first Nigerian military Coup. At the time he was also a member of the Nigerian Senate having been appointed at the time of Nigerian Independence in 1960.

Ejaife's personality

As a teacher he showed great versatility. He taught English language, English literature, Latin, Mathematics and sometimes geography. He taught in elementary and secondary schools as well as teacher's training college. His home was like another school with his children. He also tutored the children of many friends and relatives. He was encouraging good study habits. Indeed, some of his peer in his village school thought he had gone crazy when he would pluck some leaves to examine as part of his nature study lessons. The word crazy “Korebe” in Urhobo language literally translated means: “pluck leaves”. He served in the Scholarship Board of the old Western Region of Nigeria. He was also a member of the Cooperative Development Board of that region. He was mentor to such prominent people as chief justice Ovie Whiskey, Professor Bajah, Demas Akpore the current Ovie of Agbon, just to name a few. He was a reluctant but influential politician. He was very active in the Urhobo progressive union (UPU). He played a major part in the formal installation and restoration of the titleship of the Ovie of Agbon, in 1952. This was essential to participate in the House of Chiefs in the former Western Region of Nigeria. He was a world traveler, having traveled to Europe, American and Australia in connection with education and as part of his senatorial assignment. He was a man of faith and lifetime member of Sacred Heart Catholic parish in Warri. He was at knight of the blessed Murumba. Rev. Bishop Lucas Nwaezeapu was his student at St Thomas’ Ibuzor. Rev Msgr Stephen Umurie, the first Urhobo Catholic priest, was a close friend.

Friends and family
One name worthy of mentioning in MG Ejaife's life is that of his lifetime friend and contemporary, our most respected Dr F O Esiri the first Urhobo medical doctor. He was MG's personal physician and cared for him with the utmost dedication at his infirmary at Cemetery Road Warri when he had his stroke until he recovered enough to go convalesce with his son in Ibadan. It was his late wife Agnes Esiri who introduced Mrs. Cecilia Ejaife to MG as he was often called. Other notables include Chief Thomas Adogbeji Salubi with whom he interacted both at the UPU and the Urhobo College School Board, and was one of the first to recognize his scholarship potential. Anglican Bishop Arawori, Peter Inweh, were both great mentors.

MG would be very proud to know that the school he helped found is still a thriving institution today, and a bust of him has been erected as a tribute in that campus. He will also be proud than an elementary school has been named after him in his hometown of Okpara Inland. The joy of a teacher is to know that many of his pupils have surpassed his level of education and are now serving in various capacities in different walks of life, whether in academics or in public life, and at different levels. He was indeed very excited at the return of his son to Nigeria from the UK in 1969 after graduation from medical school and completing a year of internship. It was six months after that he became ill. He was to live for only barely two more years before his premature death. He had a favorite saying: “Those who aim at the tree tops, fall on the ground. Those who aim at the clouds fall above the trees”.

Personal life

It was while teaching in Warri that he met his lovely wife Cecilia Gladys Fischer, the daughter of Emmanuel Edema of number sixteen Robert Road, Warri. They got married in 1938.

Death
At the time of the military coup of 1966, like many others he had to go into hiding in the village. After the invading soldiers were driven from Warri he had to abandon his job as the principal and the senate no longer in existence under military rule. He was appointed district director of education in Ughelli locality. It was while on this job that he sustained a massive stroke in 1969, the result of hypertension of which he had been unaware. He was left with significant physical and intellectual disability that ended his career.
After spending a period of time recuperating with his son in Ibadan he was resettled in his own residence in 1971. He subsequently died at his home in March 1972 just short of the age 60. He was survived by his wife Chief Cecilia Gladys Ejaife who died in June 2002, his sons Augustine, an Engineer, John, a general surgeon in the US and Clement, now deceased, but formerly a member of the Lagos airport staff, and four grandchildren at the time of his death. He was buried in his home town Okparara waterside.

References

http://www.waado.org/educationmatters/UrhoboCollege/UrhoboCollege-Okpako.html Retrieved April 19, 2014.

https://web.archive.org/web/20130224035813/http://tribune.com.ng/news2013/index.php/en/component/k2/item/5768-i-never-tie-wrappers-on-monday-or-tuesday-esiri Retrieved April 19, 2014.

https://web.archive.org/web/20130117054203/http://www.academicexcellencesociety.com/rural_development_and_socio_cultural_associations.html Retrieved April 19, 2014.

http://www.edo-nation.net/nowao1.htm Retrieved April 19, 2014.

http://www.thenigerianvoice.com/nvnews/142602/1/upu-position-on-urhobo-governor-in-2015-and-the-24.html Retrieved April 19, 2014.

http://ucosaonline.com/?page_id=235 Retrieved April 19, 2014.

https://web.archive.org/web/20140421051049/http://asemeyese.com/index.php?option=com_content&view=article&id=1295&Itemid=797 April 11, 2014.

G.G. Darah (August 10, 2004). Urhobo and the Mowoe Legacy. Guardian. Retrieved 2010-05-29.

"Atamu Social Club of Nigeria". Urhobo National Biography. Retrieved 2010-05-29.

http://www.waado.org/urhobo_kinsfolk/archive/conferences/eigth_annual/announcements/Call_for_urhobo_awards_2009.html  Retrieved April 19, 2014.

http://www.waado.org/biographies/mowoe/MowoeBiography_Ikime/ChapFour_Leader.html Retrieved April 19, 2014.

http://www.waado.org/HistoricalAlmanacs/Awards/2004/proposal_awards/proposal.html Retrieved April 19, 2014.

1912 births
1972 deaths
Urhobo people
Fourah Bay College alumni
20th-century Nigerian politicians